Armavia Flight 967 (U8 967/RNV 967) was a scheduled international passenger flight operated by Armavia from Zvartnots International Airport, Zvarnots in Armenia to Sochi, a Black Sea coastal resort city in Russia. On 3 May 2006, the aircraft operating the route, an Airbus A320-200, crashed into the sea while attempting a go-around following its first approach to Sochi airport; all 113 aboard were killed. The accident was the first major commercial airline crash in 2006. It was Armavia's first and only fatal crash.

Flight 
The aircraft took off from Zvartnots International Airport (EVN) at a scheduled departure time at 01:45 Armenian Daylight Time (20:45 UTC, May 2), with a scheduled arrival time at Sochi International Airport (AER) of 02:00 Moscow Daylight Time (22:00 UTC, May 2).

To make their decision for departure, the crew obtained the observed weather data and the weather forecast for the takeoff, landing, and alternate aerodromes, all of which met the requirements for IFR flights. All the crew were correctly licensed and adequately rested to operate the flight.

The airplane took off from Zvartnots airport at 20:47 with 113 occupants on board: 105 passengers (including five children and one infant), two pilots, one aircraft engineer, and five flight attendants. Takeoff, climb, and cruise were uneventful.

The first communication between Sochi approach controller and the crew took place at 21:10. At that moment, the airplane was beyond the coverage area of the Sochi radar. Until 21:17, the approach controller and the crew discussed the observed and forecast weather, and as a result, the crew decided to return to Yerevan. At 21:26, after the decision had already been made, the crew asked the controller about the latest observed weather. At 21:31, the crew decided to continue the flight to Sochi airport.

The next communication with the approach controller was at 22:00.

Whilst performing the turn, the runway extended centreline was overshot. After eliminating the deviation, the crew started descending the aircraft along the glide slope, following the approach pattern. At 22:10, the crew reported that the gear was down and that they were ready for landing. The last communication with the crew was at 22:12. After that, the crew did not respond to any of the controller's calls. At 22:13, the aircraft struck the water, and broke up on impact.

Aircraft 

The aircraft involved was an A320 built in France, with its first flight in June 1995. It had an MSN number of 547 with a test registration code of F-WWIU. The aircraft was delivered in 1995 to Ansett Australia, registered in Australia as VH-HYO. It was acquired by Armavia in 2004 registered as EK-32009 with its name as Mesrop Mashtots. Armavia repainted the aircraft with its new livery on 31 October 2004. The aircraft had flown more than 10,000 hours before the crash.

Passengers and crew

Most of the passengers were citizens of Armenia. According to reports, the flight had 85 Armenian citizens, 26 Russian citizens, one Georgian citizen, and one Ukrainian citizen.

Citizenship of the passengers and crew

The captain of Flight 967 was 40-year-old Grigor Grigoryan. Born in 1966, he had completed his primary training in Krasnokutsk Civil Flight School. He graduated in 1986 and also graduated from Moscow Institute of Civil Aviation Engineers. He joined Balaklavsky United as a co-pilot in 1986. He then joined Ararat Airlines in 1997 as a captain of Yakovlev Yak-40s. He then joined Armavia as a co-pilot of Airbus A320s in 2004 and subsequently promoted to a captain in 2005. He had passed a test for an Airbus A320 captain in SAS Flight Academy in Stockholm, Sweden, with satisfactory results. Captain Grigoryan had a total of 5,458 hours of flight experience, including 1,436 hours on the Airbus A320.

The first officer (co-pilot) of Flight 967 was 29-year-old Arman Davtyan. He was born in 1977 and had completed his primary training in Ulyanovsk Civil Flying School and graduated in 1999. He then joined Chernomor-Avia in December 2001 as a co-pilot of Tupolev Tu-154s. He joined Armavia in 2002, joined Armenian Airlines in 2004, and then joined Armavia again in the same year. First Officer Davtyan had passed a training course for an Airbus A320 in SAS Flight Academy in Stockholm, Sweden, with satisfactory results. He had 2,185 flight hours, with 1,022 of them on the A320.

Recovery efforts
Flight 967 disappeared from Sochi's radar at 02:13 local time. Chief of Flight Operation N.G Savelyev alerted all the search-and-rescue services in the area and deployed an Mi-8 helicopter. At 02:19, the disappearance of Flight 967 was informed to Russia's Minister of Emergencies. A search helicopter was ready for takeoff to find the missing flight, but was not allowed by Sochi due to the deteriorating weather. The search-and-rescue operation was then suspended. At 04:08, the Ministry of Emergency's boat Valery Zamarayez found the probable crash area. Rescuers then went to the search area. From 07:30 to 12:30, the search-and-rescue team recovered 9 body parts from the crash site.

Search-and-rescue personnel only managed to recover some of the flight's debris. They recovered the Airbus' nose, landing gear, fin, elevator, and several other fragments. Wiring and electronic units were also found. In total, 52 body fragments were found by the team, as well. The Bureau of Enquiry and Analysis for Civil Aviation Safety (BEA) noted that at the time when Flight 967 impacted the sea, the landing gear was extended. The lower part of the rudder was severely damaged due to the impact forces. Several parts of the aircraft elevator were also damaged. Some of the aircraft parts recovered from the sea were severely deformed.

Causes

Harmony
The pilot had indicated an unhappiness with the late hour of the flight and the automated procedures or techniques of the autopilot. The pilot used some inputs and adjustments that appeared to be aimed at gaining command of the flight over what the automated systems had to offer. His attitude towards the aircraft and his lack of communication when making adjustments may have put additional strain on the first officer. Numerous deviations from standard procedures occurred once the captain was instructed to break off his landing approach and make a turn. The deviations combined with the lack of inputs and actions resulted in the aircraft not doing all things desired of it and also sounding a number of warnings.

Weather
The weather at the time was considered to be fine; low pressure was present near Sochi. A cold front was also detected and was forming in the Caucasian Edge and further to the east of Turkey at the time. Rain was also present in Adler (Sochi). In the spring transition period, low clouds often occurred in the Caucasian Edge, which could have limited visibility for the pilots. This proved to be dangerous, as most controlled flight into terrain  occurs due to this kind of cloud (which obscures the pilots' visual reference).

Prior to takeoff from Yerevan, the crew was briefed on the weather conditions in Sochi. At the time, the weather in Sochi was fine. After the takeoff of Flight 967, the pilots were given another weather briefing. It was still in good condition, with considerable clouds, mist, and light rain. The weather at the time would not have allowed for a vortex (i.e. storm, tornado, downdraft). In the following hours, the probability that a vortex might occur was reduced to zero. By the time Flight 967 entered Sochi, the weather conditions had deteriorated. A cold front wave occurred in Sochi, producing a cumulonimbus cloud. The rain intensified, and the visibility was reduced to 1,500 m. For several minutes, the weather became better for landing. The controllers instructed Flight 967 to abort their descent and conduct a go-around immediately, as low clouds were present at Sochi International Airport. Shortly afterwards, Flight 967 disappeared from Sochi radar.

Recorders analysis
Shortly after Flight 967 hit the water, the radio beacon signals, known as the emergency locator transmitter, started to sound. French BEA retrieved the submerged cockpit voice recorder (CVR) and flight data recorder (FDR) from the Black Sea and found only minor damage to both recorders. BEA later examined both the CVR and the FDR.

Examination
The flight was uneventful until the approach, but during the cruise stage of the flight, First Officer Davtyan stated: "[Expletive] it.. who operates such flights with the jitter and not enough sleep." The BEA also noted that neither pilot understood how the autopilot of an Airbus A320 works. Analysis of the internal communications at this stage of the flight shows that Captain Grigoryan was annoyed by the fact that in DESCENT mode (managed mode), the descent rate was not as high as he expected. BEA noted that in this mode, the descent rate is calculated automatically, depending on a number of parameters describing the descent, e.g. the aircraft attitude in relation to the preset profile and so on. 

Flight 967 was then instructed by Sochi tower to pass waypoint GUKIN and TABAN. It then passed both waypoints. While banking to turn to final approach, the rain started. First Officer Davtyan then reacted by saying exclamation words, possibly due to emotional stress. The Sochi controller then told the crew of Flight 967 that the weather in Sochi had deteriorated, and instructed the pilot to abort their descent. The crew reacted to this report, responding with negative words and expletives to the controller. The crew had been discussing the issue for three minutes, swearing about the controller's actions even between the items on the checklist. 

The aircraft climbed and started to bank, and the flaps were extended to 18°. At this point, Captain Grigoryan was heard in the CVR saying: "[Expletive] him" to the Sochi controller. The crew then contacted Sochi's holding controller and the final controller. They then selected the "glide-slope capture" descent mode, which is an automatic descent. The aircraft was descending with two engaged autopilots and engaged autothrust. The crew then proceeded to the landing checklist.

Sochi tower instructed them to abort their descent and conduct a go-around, as low clouds had formed near the airport. The aircraft climbed, the thrust levers were moved to climb position, the flaps and slats remained fully extended, and the landing gear remained fully extended. A few minutes later, the "Speed Speed Speed" (low energy) warning sounded, which advises the crew that "the aircraft energy is decreasing to the limit, below which the engine thrust must be increased to regain a positive angle of the flight path".

BEA stated that none of the crew's actions were important and necessary for a go-around procedure, such as extending the flaps and the landing gear. This demonstrated that at that time, both flight crewmen's' conditions were not at the optimum level. BEA also suspected that the low energy warning was not detected or noticed by the crew.

The autopilot was then disengaged by the crew, as they cast doubts on the autopilot (on the cruise stage of the flight, First Officer Davtyan joked about the autopilot, stating that Captain Grigoryan's autopilot was better than him, indicating that they had doubts about the autopilot and suspected that it was not functioning properly.) Captain Grigoryan then banked the aircraft to the right.

Both crew members then became more physically and emotionally stressed, as further conversations among them revealed that their intonations became higher and higher. The aircraft then decreased its pitch-up attitude and banked to the right. Then, one of the crew stepped on the rudder pedals, causing the rudder to deflect. This was not necessary. The BEA suspected that Captain Grigoryan unknowingly stepped on the pedals, while under psychoemotional stress. 

BEA then found that the crew may have been suffering a somatogravic illusion in flight. Somatogravic illusion, in aviation, is a type of optical illusion that can cause the crew to think that they are pitching up, while in reality, they are not. This could happen during night-time flying (causing the crew to lose their visual reference, as it was dark) accompanied by the lack of monitoring of the flight's indicator. Somatogravic illusion was responsible for the crash of Gulf Air Flight 072 in Bahrain. The BEA also suspected the specific features of the speed indication on the PFD, especially speed limitations for the Airbus A320 configuration that are shown as the red bars at the top of the speed indication strip. One of the crew members might have adopted the reflex acquired in training, for example, in response to a TCAS warning when the pilot is anxious to avoid the displayed red part of the instrument scale, which may result in the instinctive forward movement of the side stick, especially when the pilot is in a state of psycho-emotional strain. This version is substantiated by the fact that the pilot was monitoring the flight speed and its limitations (VFE) that depended on the Airbus A320 configuration and retracted the flaps and slats in a timely manner, and the control inputs on the side stick coincided with the moments when the current speed was getting close to the limit value. Neither of these probable causes has enough evidence, however.

The crew of Flight 967 then communicated with Sochi tower. Their words were not completed; "Sochi Radar, Armavia 967...". This was the last communication from Flight 967, as Captain Grigoryan ordered First Officer Davtyan to fully extend the flaps.

After First Officer Davtyan extended the flaps to full, a few seconds later, the master warning sounded, and continued to do so until the end of the recording. The speed at the time was too fast, which could tear the flaps apart and could cause the plane to crash, similar to Austral Lineas Aereas Flight 2553. The plane was banking to the right. Flight 967 began a nose-down attitude and the flaps then retracted to 18°. Captain Grigoryan then made an 11° nose-down input, causing the plane to descend even further.

Captain Grigoryan aggravated the condition further by making a right bank input, causing the plane to bank severely to the right, with a roll angle of 39°. The ground proximity warning system (GPWS) then sounded. First Officer Davtyan then ordered Captain Grigoryan to level off. At this moment, First Officer Davtyan intervened and moved the stick to the left position (20° to the left) to counter the increasing right bank, while Captain Grigoryan continued making his control inputs to increase the right bank. Apparently, First Officer Davtyan was trying to counter the bank only, as he also made a nose-down input, causing the plane to descend even further.

While intervening, First Officer Davtyan had not pressed the take-over push button, so both pilot's control inputs were added and prohibited. This is known as dual input. Such dual piloting is prohibited. The dual-input warning should have sounded at the time, but because its priority is lower than the GPWS, it did not, and so neither pilot knew that he was making dual inputs on the aircraft.

The crew's attention might have been distracted by the controller's direction. The controller was sending the crew a 20-second-long message. While the plane was descending, one of the crew members suddenly moved the thrust lever way back, into its idle position, and then moved the thrust lever forward, causing the autothrottle to disengage.

Primary conclusions of the final accident report

The crash of Armavia Flight 967 was a controlled flight into terrain, specifically water, while conducting a climbing maneuver after an aborted approach to Sochi airport at night with weather conditions below landing minimums for runway 06.

While performing the climb with the autopilot disengaged, the captain, being in a psychoemotional stress condition, made nose-down control inputs due to the loss of pitch and roll awareness. This started the abnormal situation. The captain's insufficient pitch-control inputs led to a failure to recover the aircraft and caused it to crash.

Along with the inadequate control inputs from the captain, the contributing factors of the crash were also the lack of monitoring the aircraft's pitch attitude, altitude, and vertical speed by the first officer and no proper reaction by the crew to GPWS warnings.

Contributory factors and shortcomings
Source:

Safety recommendations

To eliminate the shortcomings revealed during investigation of this accident, the final accident report made 22 safety recommendations:

See also

 List of accidents and incidents involving commercial aircraft
 Ethiopian Airlines Flight 409
 Flydubai Flight 981
 Air China Flight 129
 Afriqiyah Airways Flight 771
 Gulf Air Flight 072
Northwest Airlink Flight 5719, a case where a bully-ish captain treated his first officer disrespectfully, intimidating him before a collision with trees.
Kenya Airways Flight 507, another case where a bully-ish captain treated his first officer disrespectfully, intimidating him from following instructions.
 2016 Russian Defence Ministry Tupolev Tu-154 crash, a plane that crashed in 2016 near Flight 967 site.

References

External links

Interstate Aviation Committee
Final accident report - (Statistics about the crash) – English translation done by and hosted by the Bureau of Enquiry and Analysis for Civil Aviation Safety (BEA) (Archive, Alternate, Archive) – Includes comments by the BEA on the investigation, and the IAC's response to the BEA's comments
Investigation and Report (Archive) - (Statistics about the crash)  – The Russian version is the version of record
Technical Report  (Archive)
 Bureau of Enquiry and Analysis for Civil Aviation Safety
 "Accident near Sochi on 2 May 2006." (Archive)
Armeniapedia.org article on the crash

Airbus
ARMAVIA FLIGHT RNV 967 ACCIDENT IN SOCHI, RUSSIA (Archive)

Airliner accidents and incidents caused by pilot error
Aviation accidents and incidents in Russia
Aviation accidents and incidents in 2006
Airliner accidents and incidents involving controlled flight into terrain
Accidents and incidents involving the Airbus A320
May 2006 events in Asia
Armenia–Russia relations
2006 disasters in Russia